WPNW (1260 AM) is a contemporary worship music radio station in Holland, Michigan, in the United States.

Signing on the air on November 2, 1956, it originally had the call letters WJBL (standing for the initials of owner-partners John, Bud and Len). Sister station WJBL-FM had a frequency of 94.5 MHz (currently WKLQ).

WJBL became WWJQ in January 1982 when purchased by Lanser Broadcasting.  In the mid-1980s, WWJQ was a Beautiful Music station.  When it was paired with FM Sister station WJQK, they were known as WJQ AM and FM. In January 2003, WWJQ became WPNW ("praise and worship").

Lanser Broadcasting also owns WJQK.

As of September 1, 2005, it is once again a news/talk station, after several years as a praise and worship station. It's positioned as "1260 The Pledge".

On August 31, 2020, WPNW changed their format from religious talk to worship music, branded as "Joy Worship 96.5/98.9".

WPNW programming is simulcast on FM translators 96.5 W243BD and 98.9 W255DI, also licensed to Zeeland.

Previous logo

Sources
Michiguide.com - WPNW History

External links
Dr. Gene A. Getz - BiblePrinciples.org

PNW
Zeeland, Michigan
Holland, Michigan
Radio stations established in 1956
1956 establishments in Michigan
Contemporary worship music